The Shadow Ministry of Kim Beazley was the opposition Australian Labor Party shadow ministry of Australia from January 2005 to December 2006, opposing John Howard's Coalition ministry.

Leader of the Opposition: Kim Beazley
Deputy Leader of the Opposition and Shadow Minister for Education, Training, Science and Research: Jenny Macklin
Leader of the Opposition in the Senate and Shadow Minister Indigenous Affairs, Family and Community Services: Senator Chris Evans
Deputy Leader of the Opposition in the Senate and Shadow Minister for Communications and Information Technology: Senator Stephen Conroy
Shadow Treasurer: Wayne Swan
Shadow Minister for Superannuation and Intergenerational Finance, Banking and Financial Services: Senator Nick Sherry
Shadow Minister for Regional Development: Simon Crean
Shadow Minister for Health and Manager of Opposition Business in the House: Julia Gillard
Shadow Minister for Industry, Infrastructure and Industrial Relations: Stephen Smith
Shadow Minister for Finance: Lindsay Tanner
Shadow Minister for Foreign Affairs, International Security and Trade: Kevin Rudd
Shadow Minister for Immigration: Tony Burke
Shadow Minister for Defence: Robert McClelland
Shadow Minister for Homeland Security, Aviation and Transport Security: Arch Bevis
Shadow Minister for Consumer Affairs, Health Population and Health Regulation: Laurie Ferguson
Shadow Minister for Housing, Urban Development, Local Government and Territories: Senator Kim Carr 
Shadow Minister for Public Accountability and Human Services: Kelvin Thomson
Shadow Minister for Child Care, Youth and Women: Tanya Plibersek
Shadow Minister for Environment and Heritage, Deputy Manager of Opposition Business in the House: Anthony Albanese
Shadow Minister for Employment and Workplace Participation, Corporate Governance and Responsibility: Senator Penny Wong
Shadow Minister for Transport: Senator Kerry O'Brien
Assistant Shadow Treasurer and Shadow Minister for Revenue, Small Business and Competition: Joel Fitzgibbon
Shadow Attorney-General: Nicola Roxon
Shadow Minister for Agriculture and Fisheries: Gavan O'Connor
Shadow Minister for Sport and Recreation: Senator Kate Lundy
Shadow Minister for Veterans' Affairs and Shadow Special Minister of State : Alan Griffin
Shadow Minister for Defence Industry, Procurement and Personnel: Senator Mark Bishop
Shadow Minister for Aged Care, Disabilities and Carers: Senator Jan McLucas
Shadow Minister for Justice and Customs, Manager of Opposition Business in the Senate: Joe Ludwig
Shadow Minister for Pacific Island Affairs and Overseas Aid: Bob Sercombe
Shadow Minister for Citizenship and Multicultural Affairs: Senator Annette Hurley

This opposition made no distinction between the Shadow Cabinet and the Shadow Ministry.

Opposition of Australia
Beazley